The 1827 Connecticut gubernatorial election was held on April 12, 1827. Former congressman, speaker and Democratic-Republican candidate Gideon Tomlinson defeated incumbent governor and Democratic-Republican candidate Oliver Wolcott Jr., winning with 56.71% of the vote.

The Democratic-Republicans in Connecticut had grown tired of governor Wolcott, and wished to replace him. They nominated Tomlinson instead, and Tomlinson fended off a challenge from Wolcott and his supporters.

General election

Candidates
Major candidates

Gideon Tomlinson, Democratic-Republican, Tomlinson Faction
Oliver Wolcott Jr., Democratic-Republican, Wolcott Faction

Minor candidates
David Daggett, Federalist
Timothy Pitkin, Federalist

Results

References

1827
Connecticut
Gubernatorial